Jonathan Iván Requena (born 11 June 1996) is an Argentine professional footballer who plays as a midfielder.

Career
Requena's first club was Banfield of Primera B Nacional. He made his professional debut on 2 February 2013 in a 2–2 draw with one of his future clubs in Defensa y Justicia. His next appearance for Banfield came in the Copa Argentina on 13 March, he scored the winning goal in a 2–1 win against Central Norte. He netted his first league goal in the following October versus Aldosivi, in a season that ended in promotion to the Argentine Primera División as title winners. He went onto score one goal in twelve games in the top-flight. On 26 January 2016, Requena joined Primera B Metropolitana club Atlanta on loan for six months.

In total, he made five appearances in the 2016 Primera B Metropolitana before returning to Banfield. On 14 August 2017, Requena joined Primera División team Defensa y Justicia. He departed in July 2018 following zero first-team appearances for the club, subsequently signing for Deportes Temuco of the Chilean Primera División. His debut arrived on 26 July in the Copa Sudamericana against San Lorenzo, a match that they ended with a victory but one that was later awarded as a 3–0 defeat as Requena was deemed ineligible. Temuco were relegated later that year, with Requena leaving midway through the next campaign.

In June 2019, Requena switched Chile for Paraguay by agreeing terms with River Plate. After an opening game versus Guaraní on 12 July, Requena scored his first goal for the Asunción club in his second appearance during a 2–2 draw with Sol de América on 21 July.

In November 2020, Requena signed an initial one-year deal to join Valletta FC in Malta's BOV Premier Division.

Career statistics
.

Honours
Banfield
Primera B Nacional: 2013–14

References

External links

1996 births
Living people
Footballers from Córdoba, Argentina
Argentine footballers
Association football midfielders
Argentine expatriate footballers
Expatriate footballers in Chile
Expatriate footballers in Paraguay
Argentine expatriate sportspeople in Chile
Argentine expatriate sportspeople in Paraguay
Primera Nacional players
Argentine Primera División players
Primera B Metropolitana players
Chilean Primera División players
Paraguayan Primera División players
Club Atlético Banfield footballers
Club Atlético Atlanta footballers
Defensa y Justicia footballers
Deportes Temuco footballers
River Plate (Asunción) footballers
Argentine expatriate sportspeople in Malta
Valletta F.C. players
Expatriate footballers in Malta